Óscar Filipe Machado Barros (born 16 June 1997) is a Portuguese footballer who plays for IF Gnistan, as a defender.

Football career
On 21 January 2015, Barros made his professional debut with Rio Ave in a 2014–15 Taça da Liga match against Académica. He played three full cup matches, but no league matches.

References

External links

1997 births
Living people
People from Paços de Ferreira
Portuguese footballers
Association football defenders
Rio Ave F.C. players
C.D. Cinfães players
A.R. São Martinho players
A.C. Marinhense players
G.D. Vitória de Sernache players
S.C. Vila Real players
IF Gnistan players
Portuguese expatriate footballers
Expatriate footballers in Finland
Portuguese expatriate sportspeople in Finland
Ykkönen players
Sportspeople from Porto District